The enzyme L-cysteate sulfo-lyase (EC 4.4.1.25) catalyzes the reaction

L-cysteate + H2O = hydrogensulfite + pyruvate + NH3 (overall reaction)
(1a) L-cysteate = hydrogensulfite + 2-aminoprop-2-enoate
(1b) 2-aminoprop-2-enoate = 2-iminopropanoate (spontaneous)
(1c) 2-iminopropanoate + H2O = pyruvate + NH3 (spontaneous)

This enzyme belongs to the family of lyases, specifically the class of carbon-sulfur lyases.  The systematic name of this enzyme class is L-cysteate bisulfite-lyase (deaminating; pyruvate-forming). Other names in common use include L-cysteate sulfo-lyase (deaminating), and CuyA.

References

 

EC 4.4.1
Enzymes of unknown structure